Charles Bowen was a professional baseball pitcher and outfielder in the Negro leagues. He played with the Indianapolis Athletics in 1937. He attended Wilberforce University.

References

External links
 and Seamheads

Indianapolis Athletics players
Year of birth missing
Year of death missing
Baseball outfielders
Baseball pitchers
Wilberforce University alumni